Jerzy Karol Zieliński (born January 8, 1950) is a Polish cinematographer.

Filmography

2012 - Private Peaceful
2009 - The Courageous Heart of Irena Sendler
2008 - The Lazarus Project
2005 - Fun with Dick and Jane (Director of Photography)
2004 - The SpongeBob SquarePants Movie
2004 - Dodgeball: A True Underdog Story
2003 - The Lizzie McGuire Movie
2001 - Who Is Cletis Tout?
2001 - Bubble Boy
1999 - Galaxy Quest
1999 - The Third Miracle
1999 - A.T.F.
1999 - Teaching Mrs. Tingle
1993 - The Secret Garden
1991 - Paradise
1988 - In a Shallow Grave

Awards
Nominated 2009 ASC Awards - Outstanding Achievement in Cinematography in Motion Picture/Mini-Series Television: (The Courageous Heart of Irena Sendler)
Won 1981 Kraków Film Festival - Best Cinematography (The Primer)

References

External links

1950 births
Polish cinematographers
Film people from Szczecin
Living people